The Athens Olympic Aquatic Centre is a complex at the Athens Olympic Sports Complex, consisting of two outdoor pools and one indoor pool, that was built for the 1991 Mediterranean Games. It was refurbished and expanded for the 2004 Summer Olympics. The larger of the outdoor pools, which seats 11,500 spectators, hosted swimming and water polo events. The smaller pool, which hosted synchronized swimming, sat 5,300 fans. The indoor pool, which hosted the diving events, sat 6,200 observers.  It is used for swimming, too.

The outdoor pool was the subject of significant controversy during the run-up to the Olympic games. A roof was planned that would have shielded the swimmers from the blazing Athens sun.  This feature was later scrapped, leaving the athletes and most of the fans without shade during the events.  The venue was however, FINA approved.  

As of August 2015, the outdoor venue is now being used to host swimming programs.

In 2022 the two outdoor pools remain wide open to the sky.

References

2004 Summer Olympics official report. Volume 2. pp. 201, 207, 227, 231.
OAKA.com profile 
www.Oylimpic Properties.com.gr

Sports venues completed in 1991
Venues of the 2004 Summer Olympics
Olympic diving venues
Olympic swimming venues
Olympic synchronized swimming venues
Olympic water polo venues
Aquatic
Panathinaikos A.O.
1991 establishments in Greece